Bomi-1 is an electoral district for the elections to the House of Representatives of Liberia. The district covers Tubmanburg City and Senjeh District (except for the Maher community).

Elected representatives

References

Electoral districts in Liberia